Ziwe is an American late-night talk show hosted and executive produced by comedian Ziwe Fumudoh based in New York City. The show premiered on May 9, 2021, on Showtime.

In June 2021, Showtime renewed the series for a second season.

Episodes

Series overview

Season 1 (2021)

Season 2 (2022)

Production
In October 2020, it was announced Ziwe Fumudoh would star and executive produce a late-night talk show and variety series for Showtime, produced by A24. The series was filmed over the course of 15 days in February 2021. Nicholas Britell composed the series theme song.

Reception
On Rotten Tomatoes, the series holds an approval rating of 73% based on 11 reviews, with an average rating of 6.00/10.  On Metacritic, the series holds a rating of 69 out of 100, based on 8 critics, indicating "generally favorable reviews".

Notes

References

External links
 
 
 
 

2020s American late-night television series
2020s American television talk shows
2021 American television series debuts
English-language television shows
Showtime (TV network) original programming
Television series by A24